Chhiyali is a village in Barmer district, Rajasthan, India.

Location 

Rakhi Railway Station:  10.5 KM

Mokalsar, Railway Station:  12 KM

Samdari Junction Railway Station: 23 KM

Villages in Barmer district